The 2011 Pittsburg State Gorillas football team represented Pittsburg State University during the 2011 NCAA Division II football season. The Gorillas played their home games at Carnie Smith Stadium in Pittsburg, Kansas, which has been the Gorillas' home stadium since 1924. The  team was headed by coach Tim Beck. The team finished the regular season with a 9-1 record. This year they won their second NCAA Division II Football Championship (and fourth overall), with a win over Wayne State 35-21.

Schedule

References

Pittsburg State
Pittsburg State Gorillas football seasons
NCAA Division II Football Champions
Mid-America Intercollegiate Athletics Association football champion seasons
Pittsburg State Gorillas football